Lizaan du Plessis (born 23 February 1986) is a former professional tennis player from South Africa.

Biography
Born in Somerset East on the Eastern Cape, du Plessis made her Fed Cup debut for South Africa in 2005 and went on to feature in a total of ten ties.

She won seven titles on the ITF circuit, one in singles and six in doubles.

At the 2007 All-Africa Games in Algiers, she won silver medals in both singles and doubles events.

ITF finals

Singles: 5 (1–4)

Doubles: 11 (6–5)

See also
 List of South Africa Fed Cup team representatives

References

External links
 
 
 

1986 births
Living people
South African female tennis players
People from Somerset East
African Games medalists in tennis
African Games silver medalists for South Africa
Competitors at the 2007 All-Africa Games
White South African people
Sportspeople from the Eastern Cape